Terrence Tinsley (born 6 July 1957) is a British former cyclist. He competed in the sprint and the 1000m time trial events at the 1980 Summer Olympics.

Cycling career
In addition to his Olympic Games representation he also represented England and competed in the 10 miles scratch race and 1,000 metres match race and won a bronze medal in the 1 km time trial, at the 1982 Commonwealth Games in Brisbane, Queensland, Australia.

Tinsley was a 12 times British track champion, winning the Sprint title in 1980, 1983, 1984 and 1985,  the Time Trial title in 1981,  the Tandem title from 1980-1982,  the Omnium in 1983 and the Keirin from 1983-1985.

References

External links
 

1957 births
Living people
British male cyclists
Olympic cyclists of Great Britain
Cyclists at the 1980 Summer Olympics
People from St Helens, Merseyside
Commonwealth Games medallists in cycling
Commonwealth Games bronze medallists for England
Cyclists at the 1982 Commonwealth Games
Medallists at the 1982 Commonwealth Games